() is a Portuguese television mystery music game show based on South Korean programme I Can See Your Voice. It premiered on SIC on 17 July 2022.

Gameplay

Format
Presented with a group of seven "mystery singers" identified only by their occupation, a guest artist and contestant must attempt to eliminate bad singers from the group without ever hearing them sing, assisted by clues and a celebrity panel over the course of five rounds. At the end of the game, the last remaining mystery singer is revealed as either good or bad by means of a duet between them and one of the guest artists.

Rewards
The contestant must eliminate one mystery singer at the end of each round, receiving  if they eliminate a bad singer. At the end of the game, the contestant may either end the game and keep the money they had won in previous rounds, or risk it for a chance to double its winnings as jackpot prize by correctly guessing whether the last remaining mystery singer is good or bad. If the singer is bad, the contestant's winnings is given to the bad singer instead.

Rounds
Each episode presents the guest artist and contestant with seven people whose identities and singing voices are kept concealed until they are eliminated to perform on the "stage of truth" or remain in the end to perform the final duet.

Production
Impresa first announced the development of the series as part of projects relating to SIC's 30th founding anniversary in February 2022, following the successful broadcasts of A Máscara. It is produced by Warner Bros. International Television Production; the staff team is managed by executive producers Pedro Cardoso and Daniel Cruzeiro, producer Cristina Verdú, and directors Nuno Garcia and Daniel Oliveira.

Episodes

Guest artists

Reception

Television ratings

Source:

Notes

References

External links

International versions of I Can See Your Voice
2020s Portuguese television series
2022 Portuguese television series debuts
Portuguese television series based on South Korean television series
Portuguese-language television shows
Sociedade Independente de Comunicação original programming